Violet Horner (1892 – 1970) was an American silent film actress. She had several starring roles including in one of the Lena Rivers films (based on the Mary Jane Holmes novel) released in 1914 and a series of films made with Billy Quirk for Gem Motion Picture Company including Billy's Adventure.

Her father was an engineer and she spent some of her youth living with him in Brazil. She began her career in theater.

She worked for IMP and Fox Film studios.

Filmography
How Ned Got the Raise (1912), an extant film
The Man from the West (1912)
The Bald Headed Club (1912)
A Cave Man Wooing (1912)
The Castaway (1912 film)
The Bridal Room (1912), as Mary Carter
Damages in Full (1913)
Billy's Adventure (1913), one in a series of films made by actors Billy Quirk and Violet Horner for the Gem Motion Picture Company 
Bob's Baby (1913), as Mrs. Robert Waring 
A Modern Romance (1913)
She Slept Through It All (1913)
Lena Rivers (1914 Whitman film)
The Ring and the Man (1914), as Eleanor
Shore Acres (1914)
The Garden of Lies (1915), as Jessica Mannering The Stolen Voice (1915), an extant filmTillie the Terrible Typist (1915)The Girl from Alaska (1915)The Marble Heart (film) (1916)A Daughter of the Gods (1916), as Zarrah The Fighting Chance (1916)Enlighten Thy Daughter'' (1917), as Mrs. Laurence

References

External links

20th-century American actresses
1892 births
1970 deaths